In Greek mythology, Iapetus, also Japetus, is a Titan, the son of Uranus and Gaia and father of Atlas, Prometheus, Epimetheus, and Menoetius. He was also called the father of Buphagus and Anchiale in other sources.

Iapetus was linked to Japheth (יֶפֶת) one of the sons of Noah and a progenitor of mankind in biblical accounts. The practice by early historians and biblical scholars of identifying various historical nations and ethnic groups as descendants of Japheth, together with the similarity of their names, led to a fusion of their identities, from the early modern period to the present.

Mythology
Iapetus ("the Piercer") is the one Titan mentioned by Homer in the Iliad as being in Tartarus with Cronus. He is a brother of Cronus, who ruled the world during the Golden Age but is now locked up in Tartarus along with Iapetus, where neither breeze nor light of the sun reaches them.

Iapetus' wife is usually described as a daughter of Oceanus and Tethys named either Clymene (according to Hesiod and Hyginus) or Asia (according to Apollodorus).

In Hesiod's Works and Days Prometheus is addressed as "son of Iapetus", and no mother is named. However, in Hesiod's Theogony, Clymene is listed as Iapetus' wife and the mother of Prometheus. In Aeschylus's play Prometheus Bound, Prometheus is son of the goddess Themis with no father named (but still with at least Atlas as a brother). However, in Horace's Odes, in Ode 1.3 Horace writes "audax Iapeti genus ... Ignem fraude mala gentibus intulit" ("The bold offspring of Iapetus [i.e. Prometheus] ... brought fire to peoples by wicked deceit").

Hesiod and other Greek scholars regarded the sons of Iapetus as mankind's ancestors and as such, some of humanity's worst qualities were said to have been inherited from these four gods, each of whom were described with a particular moral fault that often led to their own downfall. For instance, sly and clever Prometheus could perhaps represent crafty scheming; the inept and guileless Epimetheus, foolish stupidity; the enduring, strongest and powerful Atlas, excessive daring; and the arrogant Menoetius, rash violence.

Iapetus as the progenitor of mankind has been equated with Japheth, the son of Noah, based on the similarity of their names and the tradition, reported by  Josephus (Antiquities of the Jews), which made Japheth the ancestor of the "Japhetites", i.e. the Indo-European speaking peoples. Iapetus was linked to Japheth by 17th-century theologian Matthew Poole (and more recently by Robert Graves) and by John Pairman Brown.

Genealogy

Notes

References
 Caldwell, Richard, Hesiod's Theogony, Focus Publishing/R. Pullins Company (June 1, 1987). .
Clement of Alexandria, Recognitions from Ante-Nicene Library Volume 8, translated by Smith, Rev. Thomas. T. & T. Clark, Edinburgh. 1867. Online version at theoi.com
Diodorus Siculus, The Library of History translated by Charles Henry Oldfather. Twelve volumes. Loeb Classical Library. Cambridge, Massachusetts: Harvard University Press; London: William Heinemann, Ltd. 1989. Vol. 3. Books 4.59–8. Online version at Bill Thayer's Web Site
Diodorus Siculus, Bibliotheca Historica. Vol 1-2. Immanel Bekker. Ludwig Dindorf. Friedrich Vogel. in aedibus B. G. Teubneri. Leipzig. 1888-1890. Greek text available at the Perseus Digital Library.
Hesiod, Theogony from The Homeric Hymns and Homerica with an English Translation by Hugh G. Evelyn-White, Cambridge, MA.,Harvard University Press; London, William Heinemann Ltd. 1914. Online version at the Perseus Digital Library. Greek text available from the same website.
Hesiod, Works and Days from The Homeric Hymns and Homerica with an English Translation by Hugh G. Evelyn-White, Cambridge, MA.,Harvard University Press; London, William Heinemann Ltd. 1914. Online version at the Perseus Digital Library. Greek text available from the same website.
Homer, The Iliad with an English Translation by A.T. Murray, Ph.D. in two volumes. Cambridge, MA., Harvard University Press; London, William Heinemann, Ltd. 1924. Online version at the Perseus Digital Library.
Homer. Homeri Opera in five volumes. Oxford, Oxford University Press. 1920. Greek text available at the Perseus Digital Library.
Homeric Hymn to Hermes (4), in The Homeric Hymns and Homerica with an English Translation by Hugh G. Evelyn-White, Cambridge, Massachusetts., Harvard University Press; London, William Heinemann Ltd. 1914. Online version at the Perseus Digital Library.
Pausanias, Description of Greece with an English Translation by W.H.S. Jones, Litt.D., and H.A. Ormerod, M.A., in 4 Volumes. Cambridge, MA, Harvard University Press; London, William Heinemann Ltd. 1918. Online version at the Perseus Digital Library
Pausanias, Graeciae Descriptio. 3 vols. Leipzig, Teubner. 1903.  Greek text available at the Perseus Digital Library.
Apollodorus, The Library with an English Translation by Sir James George Frazer, F.B.A., F.R.S. in 2 Volumes, Cambridge, MA, Harvard University Press; London, William Heinemann Ltd. 1921. Online version at the Perseus Digital Library. Greek text available from the same website.
Stephanus of Byzantium, Stephani Byzantii Ethnicorum quae supersunt, edited by August Meineike (1790-1870), published 1849. A few entries from this important ancient handbook of place names have been translated by Brady Kiesling. Online version at the Topos Text Project.

Greek gods
Children of Gaia
Titans (mythology)
Condemned souls in Tartarus